Ǝ ǝ or turned E is an additional letter of the Latin alphabet used in African languages using the Pan-Nigerian alphabet or the African reference alphabet. The minuscule is based on a rotated e and the capital form majuscule Ǝ, based on a reversed (mirrored) majuscule E.

In MacOS with the U.S. Extended keyboard, the letters Ǝ ǝ are made with  followed by E e respectively.

Unicode encodings

Latin-script letters